Douglas Williams Neff (October 8, 1891 – May 23, 1932) was a  Major League Baseball infielder who played for the Washington Senators in  and . He is buried at the University of Virginia cemetery.

External links

1891 births
1932 deaths
Washington Senators (1901–1960) players
Major League Baseball infielders
Baseball players from Virginia
Burials at the University of Virginia Cemetery
People from Harrisonburg, Virginia